The Brandenburglied (also known under the title of "Märkische Heide", or Märkish Heath) was a music piece written for the Province of Brandenburg, then within the Kingdom of Prussia of the German Empire.

It was used in the province from 1906 to 1936.

In present days it is used as unofficial anthem of the German federal state of Brandenburg.

There is an adaptation of this melody by the Chilean Army, which named it «Mi Fusil y Yo» (My rifle and me).

References

See also

German anthems
Kingdom of Prussia
20th century in Brandenburg
Culture of Prussia
Songs about Germany